Joseph G. Armstrong (1867–1931) was born in Allegheny City, what is today the Northside neighborhood of the U.S. city of Pittsburgh. He became a glassmaker and eventually participated in the glass union and labor movement. From his labor connections he was elected to City Council and then ran successfully for County Coroner in 1904. He was coroner during the Pressed Steel Car Strike of 1909. He died of pneumonia in Pittsburgh on November 19, 1931 and is interred in South Side Cemetery, Pittsburgh.

Pittsburgh politics
After being seated mayor in 1914, Armstrong went on an unprecedented building spree in the city, earning him the affectionate nickname "Joe the builder" among voters. His classical structures still grace the city today, including the massive 10 story City-County Building taking up an entire city block. His rule as mayor was also responsible for massive construction projects that are not so easily visible such as the Armstrong Tunnel which for the first time allowed easy access from the Grant & Liberty section of downtown to the Southside neighborhood under the steep hill that Duquesne University sits on in the Bluff neighborhood.

References

1867 births
1931 deaths
Mayors of Pittsburgh
Deaths from pneumonia in Pennsylvania